The 2017–18 Danish 1st Division season was the 22nd season of the Danish 1st Division league championship, governed by the Danish Football Association.

The division-champion, the runners-up and the third placed team are promoted to the 2018–19 Danish Superliga. The teams in 11th and 12th places are relegated to the 2018–19 Danish 2nd Divisions.

Participants
Esbjerg fB finished last in the 2016–17 Danish Superliga relegation play-off and were relegated to the 1st Division for the first time since the 2010-11 season. Viborg FF lost to FC Helsingør in the relegation play off and were relegated after two seasons in the first tier as well. Hobro IK and FC Helsingør were promoted to the 2017–18 Danish Superliga.

AB and Næstved Boldklub were relegated to the 2017–18 Danish 2nd Divisions. AB were relegated immediately after just one season at the second tier while Næstved Boldklub lasted two seasons in the league. Thisted FC and Brabrand IF won promotion from the 2016–17 Danish 2nd Divisions. Thisted and Brabrand will play at the 1st Division for the first time since the 2009-10 season.

Stadia and locations 

‡: Due to the weather conditions (frost), two spring home matches on 4 and 18 March at were moved to Gentofte Sportspark.

Personnel and sponsoring 
Note: Flags indicate national team as has been defined under FIFA eligibility rules. Players and Managers may hold more than one non-FIFA nationality.

Managerial changes

League table

References

External links
  Danish FA

2017–18 in Danish football
Danish 1st Division
Danish 1st Division seasons
2017–18 in Danish football leagues